Crestmont station is a railroad station in the Crestmont section of Abington Township, Montgomery County, Pennsylvania on SEPTA's  Warminster Line, formerly the Reading New Hope branch.  It is located at the intersection of Rubicam Avenue and Rockwell Road.  The station parking lot has 24 spaces.  The station contains no ticket or station facilities and consists only of a shelter. Crestmont is a flag stop except during peak hours and late at night, meaning trains will only stop if there are passengers on the platform or if a passenger on the train notifies the conductor they want to get off.   In FY 2013, Crestmont station had a weekday average of 89 boardings and 91 alightings. This station is wheelchair ADA accessible.

Station layout

References

External links
SEPTA – Crestmont Station
 Station from Google Maps Street View

SEPTA Regional Rail stations
Stations on the Warminster Line
Railway stations in Montgomery County, Pennsylvania